Statistics of 1. deild in the 1992 season.

Overview
It was contested by 10 teams, and B68 Toftir won the championship.

League standings

Results
The schedule consisted of a total of 18 games. Each team played two games against every opponent in no particular order. One of the games was at home and one was away.

Top goalscorers
Source: faroesoccer.com

14 goals
 Símun Petur Justinussen (GÍ)

11 goals
 Uni Arge (HB)

10 goals
 Øssur Hansen (B68)
 Olgar Danielsen (KÍ)

8 goals
 Jákup Símun Simonsen (B36)
 Aksel Højgaard (B68)
 Bogi Johannesen (TB)

7 goals
 Jens Kristian Hansen (B36)
 Gunnar Mohr (HB)

1. deild seasons
Faroe
Faroe
1